The 1980 Davison's Classic was a women's tennis tournament played on indoor carpet courts at the Alexander Memorial Coliseum in Atlanta, Georgia in the United States. The event was part of the AA category of the 1980 Colgate Series. It was the fifth edition of the tournament and was held from September 22 through September 28, 1980. Third-seeded Hana Mandlíková won the singles title and earned $20,000 first-prize money.

Finals

Singles
 Hana Mandlíková defeated  Wendy Turnbull 6–3, 7–5
It was Mandlíková's 2nd singles title of the year and the 9th of her career.

Doubles
 Barbara Potter /  Sharon Walsh defeated  Kathy Jordan /  Anne Smith 6–3, 6–1

Prize money

Notes

References

External links
 International Tennis Federation (ITF) tournament edition details

Davison's Classic
Davison's Classic
Davison's Classic
Davison's Classic
Tennis tournaments in Georgia (U.S. state)
Women's tennis tournaments in the United States